Rodrigo Díaz (died 31 August 1249) was a Roman Catholic prelate who served as Bishop of Oviedo (1243–1249).

On 17 September 1243, Rodrigo Díaz was appointed by Pope Innocent IV as Bishop of Oviedo. He was consecrated by Juan Domínguez de Medina, Bishop of Burgos. He served as Bishop of Oviedo until his death on 31 August 1249.

References 

1249 deaths
13th-century Roman Catholic bishops in Castile
Bishops appointed by Pope Innocent IV